O2: Avalon Remixed is Avalon's sixth release, the group's first remix album.  Originally scheduled to be released concurrently with Oxygen, it was eventually released on March 26, 2002.  The album contains 12 remixes of previous tracks that originally appeared on the albums A Maze of Grace (1997), In a Different Light (1999), and Oxygen (2001).

Track listing

References

Avalon (band) albums
2002 remix albums
Sparrow Records remix albums